Thrikkodithanam  is a village in Kottayam district in the state of Kerala, India. It is located on the outskirts of Changanassery Municipality.

The area of the villages is 9.5 km2. The local administrative body is called the Panchayat and it is one of the seven in Madapally Block. Other Panchayats adjoining Thrikodithanam are Paippad and Kunnamthanam.

Demographics
 Thrikkodithanam had a population of 33,087 according to the India census: 16,482 males and 16,605 females.

Etymology
The name Thrikodithanam is believed to have come from the thi-kodi-sthanam, meaning "location of three flags".

Mahavishnu Temple
The village is famous for its Thrikodithanam Mahavishnu Temple, which was built during the reign of the second Chera Empire c. 800 AD. There is a stone fortress called Bhoodathan Kotta around this temple. According to local legends, the fortress was built out of a single stone, overnight, by a spirit (bhoodam). There is also a beautiful lake in front of the temple.
Devoted to Lord Vishnu, Thrikodithanam Mahavishnu Kshetram, alias Adbhuta Narayanan Temple, is one of the five Pancha-Pandava temples in Kerala and among the 108 Vishnu temples in India. This 9th-century temple is  located at Thrikodithanam in Changanacherry, 25 km from Kottayam. Adbhuta Narayanan is the chief deity and his idol along with consort Karpagavalli, in standing posture, is made of an unusual black stone called Aanjana-kallu. The temple also houses the idols of Lord Shiva, Lord Krishna, Ganapathi, Narasimha, Nagadevas, and Kshetrapala.The temple structure is an architectural excellence adorned with beautiful mural paintings. The temple sanctum (sreekovil) is a double-storied structure built on a circular plan. The base of the sanctum is made of three ft high rounded granite stones and centuries old inscriptions can be seen here. The temple complex has two entrances, i.e. on the east and west.

Sri Murugan Temple
Sri Murugan temple is situated next to Thrikodithanam Mahavishnu Temple. Most devotees visiting the Thrikodithanam Mahavishnu Temple also happen to visit the Sri Murugan temple.

Temple Pond
There is a beautiful and sacred pond near the main entrance of Thrikodithanam Mahavishnu Temple, i.e. Eastern Gate. Between the pond and the entrance there a strange granite statue known as Kazhivetti kallu. The 10-day annual festival is celebrated during the lunar month of Vrishchigom (November–December). The major highlight of the festival commences after dusk on the 9th day and carries on until the early hours of the following morning. It is a huge display of 1001 flares made of cloth bundles dipped in oil and placed on a pyramidal structure.

Saint Xavier's Catholic Church
Saint Xavier's Catholic Church is one of the 27 Forane churches under the administration of Syro-Malabar Catholic Archeparchy of Changanassery. Many famous churches like St.Sebastian's Church, Kodinattumkunnu and St. Sebastian's Church, Kottamuri comes under this forane.

References

External links
 Thrikodithanam - Location on Google Maps
 Thrikodithanam General Information
 Thrikodithanam Maha-Vishnu Temple
 Thrikodithanam Maha-Vishnu Temple

Villages in Kottayam district